Cheryl Stern is an American Broadway actress.

Education 
Stern is a graduate of Northwestern University.

Career 
Stern worked as a backup performer for comedian Jackie Mason and was in his comedy musical Laughing Room Only.

In 2009, she starred in the Transport Group's "Being Audrey"  She starred opposite Cynthia Nixon in The Women and in the 2010 Tony Award winning revival of La Cage aux Folles. More recently, she appeared as The Old Lady in Mary Zimmerman's acclaimed production of Candide at the Huntington Theatre in Boston.

Awards 
She is a past winner of a Jonathan Larson Grant in 2002 for Normal with Tom Kochan and Yvonne Adrian at the Lark Theatre Company.

References

Living people
American stage actresses
American film actresses
Year of birth missing (living people)
21st-century American women